Yaraslav Iharavich Shyla (born 5 March 1993 in Minsk) is a Belarusian tennis player.

Shyla has a career high ATP singles ranking of 306 achieved on 22 June 2015. He also has a career high ATP doubles ranking of 164 achieved on 15 June 2015.

Shyla won his first Challenger title of any kind in the doubles event at the 2015 Batman Cup, partnering Aslan Karatsev, defeating Mate Pavić and Michael Venus in the final.

ITF finals (37-21)

Singles (5-6)

Doubles (32-15)

References

External links
 
 
 
 

1993 births
Living people
Belarusian male tennis players
Tennis players from Minsk
21st-century Belarusian people